Out for Blood may refer to:
Out for Blood (Lita Ford album), 1983
Out for Blood (Sadus album), 2006
Out for Blood (Unit:187 album), 2010
Out for Blood (Farewell Flight album), 2011
"Out for Blood", a song by Pantera from their 1984 album Projects in the Jungle
"Out for Blood", a song by Agnostic Front from their 1986 album Cause for Alarm
"Out for Blood", a song by The Crown from their 2002 album Crowned in Terror
"Out for Blood" (song), by Sum 41
The Inventor: Out for Blood in Silicon Valley, a 2019 HBO documentary about fraud at the blood testing company Theranos